Horton College was a 19th-century independent Wesleyan methodist boys' boarding school, at Mona Vale near , Tasmania, Australia. Founded by Captain Samuel Horton in 1855, the College closed in 1894; and during its brief period it was considered an extremely prestigious school, counting many of the region's landed families of the period as students.

The school building itself was an impressive red brick structure, designed by William Archer and its ruins were listed on the (now-defunct) Register of the National Estate from 1978.

Closure
The College fell into financial ruin following a great economic depression that hit the state in the 1890s and the college was forced to shut due to debts. The College Board of Trustees, owning the building but not the land (which was in trust from Captain Horton's estate), handed the entire property back to his nephew. For many years the nephews son lived in the school building but in 1917 he moved and the building was torn down to sell the materials. The bells from the building are still used by the Hutchins School, while the bricks were used to build Horton Cottage and parts of what is now Scotch Oakburn College. The building's entrance arch still stands and is visible from the highway.

Notable alumni
 Members of the Archer family
 William Henry Burgess, member of Tasmanian parliament
 Colin Campbell, physician and champion Australian rules footballer with Essendon
 Crowther family
 Sir John Davies and Charles Davies, sons of the founder of The Mercury
 Arthur Groom, member of the Victorian parliament
 Kermode family
 William Lyne, Premier of New South Wales
 Alexander Malcolm - New Zealand member of parliament from Balclutha 
 Albert Solomon - Premier of Tasmania

References

External links
 Photo of the College in the LINC collection

1855 establishments in Australia
Educational institutions established in 1855
Wesleyan schools
Defunct schools in Tasmania
1894 disestablishments in Australia
Educational institutions disestablished in the 1890s